Completed in January 1997, Ebisu Prime Square is located at the Shibuya-bashi intersection where the tradition of Hiroo meets the trend of Ebisu. The square is composed of the Office Tower, home to foreign companies and IT firms; the Plaza, with a variety of stores; and the City Tower, offering luxury apartments.

References

Buildings and structures in Shibuya